"Vapaus käteen jää" is a Finnish-language song by Finnish pop rock band Haloo Helsinki!. The song peaked at number one on the Finnish download chart and number two on the Finnish singles chart. According to Turun Sanomat, the single had sold gold by late August 2013, with officially certified sales of 6,000 copies to date.

Track listing

Charts and certifications

Weekly charts

Certifications

References

External links
 Official music video of "Vapaus käteen jää" on YouTube

2013 singles
2013 songs
Haloo Helsinki! songs
Finnish-language songs
Songs written by Rauli Eskolin